Lufuradom (INN) is a drug and benzodiazepine derivative which, unlike other benzodiazepines, is described as an analgesic. Similarly to its analogue tifluadom, it was never marketed.

See also 
 Tifluadom
 GYKI-52895, structural benzodiazepine which is a dopamine reuptake inhibitor without GABAergic function
 GYKI-52,466, structural benzodiazepine which is an AMPAkine and glutamate antagonist without GABAergic function

References 

Carboxamides
Analgesics
Benzodiazepines
Kappa-opioid receptor agonists
Opioids
Fluoroarenes